Biswajit Das is an Indian politician from the Bharatiya Janata Party. In May 2021, he was elected as a member of the West Bengal Legislative Assembly from Bagdah (constituency). He defeated Paritosh Kumar Saha of All India Trinamool Congress by 9,792 votes in 2021 West Bengal Assembly election.

In 2011 & 2016, he was elected to West Bengal Legislative Assembly from Bangaon Uttar as All India Trinamool Congress candidate before joining Bharatiya Janata Party in 2019. Later in 2021, he returned to the All India Trinamool Congress.

References 

Living people
21st-century Indian politicians
People from North 24 Parganas district
Bharatiya Janata Party politicians from West Bengal
West Bengal MLAs 2021–2026
1967 births
Trinamool Congress politicians